Steve Nunno is an American gymnastics coach. Most notably, he coached Shannon Miller to the 1992 and 1996 Olympics.

References

American male artistic gymnasts
Living people
Year of birth missing (living people)